Beenakia is a genus of fungi in the Clavariadelphaceae family. The genus has a widespread distribution, and contains seven species.

References

External links

Gomphales
Agaricomycetes genera
Taxa named by Derek Reid